The following is a list of managers of Panathinaikos F.C. and their major honours from the foundation of the club in 1908 to the present.

Managers
Only competitive matches are counted
(n/a) = Information not available

External links 
All time Panathinaikos' coaches (official website)
list of Panathinaikos managers prasinanea.gr

Notes and references
Specific

Managers

Panathinaikos F.C.